Wei (350–352), known as Ran Wei in Chinese historiography, was a short-lived state established by Ran Min. In 350, Ran Wei usurped the Later Zhao state in the city of Ye and declared himself emperor of Wei. In 352, Ran Wei was defeated by the Former Yan.

History
Ran Min, a general of Later Zhao, took advantage of a succession crisis after the death of Zhao emperor Shi Hu, and declared himself emperor in 350. 

At the same time, Shi Zhi, Prince Xinxing of Zhao, claimed the throne of Zhao in the city of Xiangguo (襄國). He also sought help from the Former Yan and other states in northern China. Ran Min attacked the city but was initially defeated. However, Shi Zhi was killed by general Liu Xian in 351.

Ran Min attacked Xiangguo again in 352, this time successfully. In May, Ran Min was defeated and captured by Yan forces led by Murong Ke. In the Yan capital Ji, Ran Min insulted the Yan emperor Murong Jun, claiming that his people were "barbarians and animals" (夷狄禽獸之類). He was subsequently executed.

Ruler

References

 
350 establishments
352 disestablishments
4th century in China
Dynasties in Chinese history
Former countries in Chinese history
4th-century establishments in China